WCCT may refer to:

 WCCT-FM, a radio station (90.3 FM) licensed to Harwich, Massachusetts, United States
 WCCT-TV, a television station (channel 33, virtual 20) licensed to Waterbury, Connecticut, United States
 WACH, a television station (channel 48/PSIP 57) licensed to Columbia, South Carolina, United States, which used the call sign WCCT-TV from 1985 until 1988